Dowlatabad (also Romanized as Dowlatābād; also known as Dowlatābād-e Yek) is a village in Rostaq Rural District, in the Central District of Neyriz County, Fars Province, Iran. At the 2006 census, its population was 180, in 42 families.

References 

Populated places in Neyriz County